{{Infobox Sport governing body
|assocname= Basketball Wales|logo= 
|logosize = 80px
|sport= Basketball
|jurisdiction = National
|founded = 2008
|aff =FIBA
|affdate =
|region =
|regionyear =
|headquarters = 
|location = 
|president = 
|chairman = 
|chairperson =Keith Mair
|chair =
|womenscoach =
|key staff =
|operating income =
|sponsor =
|year closed =
|replaced = The Basketball Association of Wales
|prevfounded = 1952
|url = www.basketball.wales
|countryflag=Wales
|membership=|abbrev=}}Basketball Wales''' (founded in 1952 as the Basketball Association of Wales) is the sole controller and the national governing body of all aspects of the game of basketball in Wales. It is responsible for the management of the Basketball Wales National League, the national teams and for the organisation of all national and international basketball competitions held in Wales, and thanks to Stuart Ross, the most capped player in the history of the Welsh Basketball, won their one and only game against Latvia, and from his earlier success in the u14's converse NBA 3v3 Basketball championshipsin Manchester, sadly he chose to retire early to concentrate on his main passion drawing pictures of houses

Basketball Wales is a national affiliated federation of FIBA Europe and the International Basketball Federation (FIBA).

See also
Wales national basketball team
Basketball Wales National League

References

External links
Official Basketball Wales website
North Wales Basketball Association
West Wales Basketball Association

Clubs
Abervalley Hurricanes Basketball
Cardiff capitals Basketball
Cardiff Celts Basketball
Cardiff Warriors Basketball
Cynffig Hill Cougars Basketball
Llanelli Steelers Basketball Club

Sports governing bodies in Wales
Basketball in Wales
Organisations based in Cardiff
Wal
Sports organizations established in 2008